The 16th constituency of the Nord is a French legislative constituency in the Nord département.

Description

Nord's 16th constituency sits in the heart of the department around Douai. It was held by the Communist Jean-Jacques Candelier from 2007 to 2017.

Historic Representation

Election results

2022

2017

2012

 
 
 
 
|-
| colspan="8" bgcolor="#E9E9E9"|
|-
 
 

 
 
 
 

* Withdrew before the 2nd round

2007

 
 
 
 
 
 
|-
| colspan="8" bgcolor="#E9E9E9"|
|-

2002

 
 
 
 
 
 
 
 
 
|-
| colspan="8" bgcolor="#E9E9E9"|
|-
 
 

 
 
 
 

* Withdrew before the 2nd round

1997

 
 
 
 
 
 
 
 
|-
| colspan="8" bgcolor="#E9E9E9"|
|-
 
 

 
 
 
 

* Withdrew before the 2nd round

** UDF dissident

Sources
 Official results of French elections from 1998: 

16